The 2016–17 season is PAS Giannina's 6th consecutive season in the Super League Greece and their 51st year in existence. They also took part in the UEFA Europa League (Second qualifying round). PAS Giannina qualified for the third qualifying round after beating Norwegian club Odd, they eventually disqualified, after losing to Dutch club AZ. It was the first time that PAS Giannina participated in the qualification process of a European competition organised by UEFA (PAS Giannina had previously participated in the Balkan Cup).

Players

International players

Foreign players

Personnel

Management

Coaching staff

medical staff

Academy

Transfers and loans

Transfers in

Transfers out

For recent transfers, see List of Greek football transfers summer 2016

For recent transfers, see List of Greek football transfers winter 2016–17

Friendlies

July friendlies

August friendlies

September friendlies

May friendlies 

The match was interrupted because Koliofoukas' serious injury

Competitions

Super League Greece

League table

Results summary

Fixtures

(Source:)

The match was postponed due to the 5.3 R Ioannina earthquake that occurred on 16 October.

Greek Football Cup

Second round

Group D

Last 16

UEFA Europa League

Second qualifying round

All times at EET

Third qualifying round

All times at EET

Statistics

Appearances 

Super League Greece

Goalscorers 

Super League Greece

Disciplinary record

Clean sheets

Best goal and MVP awards winners

Other awards 
Super League Team of the Year
 Leonardo Koutris: 2016–17

Notes

References

External links 
 Official Website of PAS Giannina 

PAS Giannina F.C. seasons
Giannina
Giannina